Calvin Hemery was the defending champion but chose not to defend his title.

Tallon Griekspoor won the title after defeating Juan Ignacio Londero 6–3, 2–6, 6–3 in the final.

Seeds

Draw

Finals

Top half

Bottom half

References
Main Draw
Qualifying Draw

Tampere Open - Men's Singles
2018 Men's Singles